Won Jin-ah (born March 29, 1991) is a South Korean actress known for her roles in Rain or Shine (2017) and Life (2018). She earned a Baeksang Arts Award nomination for Rain or Shine.

Filmography

Film

Television series

Music video

Theater

Awards and nominations

References

External links 
 

1991 births
Living people
People from Cheonan
South Korean film actresses
South Korean television actresses
21st-century South Korean actresses